Rhamphomyia pseudogibba is a species of dance flies, in the fly family Empididae. It is include in the subgenus Amydroneura of the genus Rhamphomyia.

References

Rhamphomyia
Asilomorph flies of Europe
Insects described in 1910